Tai Wong Temple in Yuen Long Kau Hui, Yuen Long District, Hong Kong, is located in Cheung Shing Street, which was the longest and busiest street of the market.

History
The temple was established at the same time as the market, during the reign of Kangxi emperor (1661-1722).

Description
The temple was built for the worship of two 'Tai Wong', literally 'great kings', Hung Shing Tai Wong and Yeung Hau Tai Wong. It is the main temple of Nam Pin Wai as well as Yuen Long Kau Hui.

Other than for worship, the temple was a venue for solving disputes and discussing market affairs among the villagers. It also once served as a yamen and the officials lived there.

Conservation
Tai Wong Temple in Yuen Long Kau Hui is listed as a Grade I Historic Building.

See also
 List of Hung Shing temples in Hong Kong
 List of Yeung Hau temples in Hong Kong

References

External links

 Pictures of Tai Wong Temple, Yuen Long Kau Hui

Taoist temples in Hong Kong
Yuen Long
Grade I historic buildings in Hong Kong